José de Santiago Concha Jiménez Lobatón (1765–1830) was interim Governor of Chile from April 1801 to December 1801. Before and after his governorship, he served as Oidor of the Real Audiencia of Santiago between 1795 and 1811 and from 1815 to 1818.

Royal Governors of Chile
Year of birth unknown
Year of death unknown